Nothing as the Ideal is the sixth studio album by American psychedelic rock band All Them Witches. It was released on September 4, 2020, through New West Records.

Background and production 
After the release of 2018's ATW, All Them Witches drummer Robby Staebler converted his Nashville home into a studio, which proved creatively uneventful for the band, who recorded only one track there. The band decided to hire Mikey Allred, who had previously produced 2015's Dying Surfer Meets His Maker, to help record their sixth studio album. After two months of writing, All Them Witches recorded Nothing as the Ideal in March 2020 at Abbey Road Studios.

Composition and themes 
Nothing as the Ideal has been classified as a stoner rock and neo-psychedelia album.

Reception 

Nothing as the Ideal was met with mostly positive reviews from music critics. At Metacritic, which assigns a normalized rating out of 100 to reviews from mainstream critics, Nothing as the Ideal has an average score of 85 based on five reviews.

Tyler Damara Kelly of The Line of Best Fit compared Nothing as the Ideal to the works of Kyuss and Tool, and praised how All Them Witches were able to retool as a trio, with "each musician being undoubtedly proficient in their craft and able to create with a dynamism that is truly unparalleled". James Christopher Monger of AllMusic, similarly, praised how the remaining band members "have crystallized their signature amalgam of improvisation and songcraft into an exclamation point where every soaring lead, snare crack, and mechanical whirr feels essential". Nicolas Perez of Paste said that the absence of keyboard was "barely noticeable since the songs have no uncomfortable gaps".

Certain critics highlighted the epic nature of the album, and individual tracks within. Polly Glass of Classic Rock said that, particularly with the addition of "See You Next Fall" and "Rats in Ruin", Nothing as the Ideal "feels as much like a film soundtrack as it does a hooky rock'n'roll album". Graeme Marsh of musicOMH added that the two longest tracks on the album "top nine minutes yet leave you dissatisfied that they didn't last twice as long". John Moore of New Noise Magazine said that the album, "though it might take a few cycles to catch, is a wildly satisfying experience".

Some reviewers criticized a perceived lack of experimentation and originality on Nothing as the Ideal. Shawn Donohue of Glide said that Nothing as the Ideal was "an excellent sounding but slightly flat affair as the band settles into life as a trio", and that the "sound experiments and tape collages" in the album "feel tacked on to spruce up a standard number more laboriously". Tom Morgan of Dead Press! compared certain tracks to Mastodon, Royal Blood, and Led Zeppelin, before asking, "Why bother to even emulate these artists and sounds from so long ago?"

Track listing

Personnel 

All Them Witches
 Michael Parks, Jr. – vocals, bass, guitar, loops, piano
 Ben McLeod – guitar, resonator, loops, piano
 Robby Staebler – drums, synthesizer, loops, tapes

Technical
 Mikey Allred – producer, mixing, mastering
 Neil Dawes – assistant engineer

Information taken from the Nothing as the Ideal liner notes.

Charts

Formats 
The album is widely available on most streaming services, but was also sold as a Digital Download from the band's website, as well as offered on Compact Disc, Vinyl, and Cassette Tape.

References 

2020 albums
New West Records albums